Klimeschiopsis sinevi is a moth in the family Gelechiidae. It was described by Oleksiy V. Bidzilya in 2012. It is found in northern Iran, eastern Georgia and Azerbaijan.

References

Klimeschiopsis
Moths described in 2012